The National Civil Aviation and Aviation Infrastructure Directorate (Dirección Nacional de Aviación Civil e Infraestructura Aeronáutica, DINACIA) is an agency of the government of Uruguay. Its headquarters is in Canelones. It is the country's civil aviation authority.

The Oficina de Investigación y Prevención de Accidentes e Incidentes de Aviación (OIPAIA) of DINACIA is the agency that investigates aviation accidents and incidents. Its head office is at Carrasco International Airport.

See also

 Austral Líneas Aéreas Flight 2553

References

External links

Government of Uruguay
Uruguay
Uruguay
Aviation organizations based in Uruguay
Civil aviation in Uruguay